Middlesex was a provincial riding in Ontario, Canada, that was created for the 1975 election. It was abolished prior to the 1999 election. It was merged into the riding of Elgin—Middlesex—London.

Boundaries
In 1975, the boundaries of the riding included the townships of Caradoc, Delaware, Ekrid, Lobo, London, Metcalfe, Mosa, North Dorchester, Westminster and West Nissouri. It also included the town of Strathroy and the villages of Glencoe, Newbury and Wardsville.

In 1986, the boundaries were changed as follows: it was realigned to include Indian reserves No. 41 and 42 and most of the county of Middlesex except for part of the city of London that lay west of Highbury Road, Huron Street, and Clarke Road.

In 1996, the provincial government reduced the number of ridings in the province from 130 to 103. They also directed the new ridings to correspond to the boundaries of the existing federal ridings. Most of Middlesex riding was merged into the new riding of Elgin—Middlesex—London.

Members of Provincial Parliament

References

Former provincial electoral districts of Ontario